Charles Morris Ankcorn (September 11, 1893 - October 1, 1955) was professor of military science at State College of Washington and Brigadier General in the U.S Army during World War II.

Early life and career 
Charles M. Ankcorn was born on September 11, 1893 in Palouse, Washington. Prior to military service, Ankcorn attended the University of Idaho and Ohio State University. During World War I, he was assigned to the infantry during 1917. Following the war, he was professor of military science and tactics at State College of Washington from 1924 to 1929.

World War II 
During World War II, Ankcorn commanded the 157th Infantry Regiment from September 1940 to September 1943, seeing first action during the Allied invasion of Sicily. He was awarded the Distinguished Service Cross, and during September 1943, Ankcorn was promoted to the rank of brigadier general, but was injured by an antipersonnel mine. He returned to the U.S. in January, 1944.

Later life 
Ankcorn retired from military service in December, 1944. Ankcorn died on October 1, 1955.

Awards

Distinguished Service Cross

Citation 
 Colonel (Infantry) Charles M. Ankcorn, United States Army, was awarded the Distinguished Service Cross for extraordinary heroism in connection with military operations against an armed enemy while serving with the 157th Infantry Regiment, 45th Infantry Division, in action against enemy forces in July 1943. Colonel Ankcorn's outstanding leadership, personal bravery and zealous devotion to duty exemplify the highest traditions of the military forces of the United States and reflect great credit upon himself, the 45th Infantry Division, and the United States Army.

References

External links 

 

1893 births
1955 deaths
Military personnel from Washington, D.C.
Recipients of the Distinguished Service Cross (United States)
University of Idaho alumni
United States Army personnel of World War I
United States Army generals of World War II
Ohio State University alumni
Washington State University faculty
People from Palouse, Washington
Landmine victims
United States Army generals